Yu is a 2003 Austrian drama film directed by Franz Novotny. It was entered into the 25th Moscow International Film Festival.

Cast
 André Eisermann as Chris
 Gedeon Burkhard as Tom
 Marina Bukvicki
 Nikola Djuricko
 Vanja Ejdus
 Dejan Lutkic
 Ana Maljevic as Sonja
 Ivana Mrvaljevic
 Ljubisa Samardzic
 David Scheller as Alex
 Ana Stefanovic as Jelena

References

External links
 

2003 films
2003 drama films
2000s German-language films
Austrian drama films
Films directed by Franz Novotny